General Martín Francisco Javier Mina y Larrea (July 1, 1789 – November 11, 1817), nicknamed El Mozo or El Estudiante (Student), was a Spanish lawyer and army officer, who later became a Mexican independence figure.

Biography
Francisco Javier Mina was born in Otao, Navarre, to Juan Mina, a wealthy farmer, and Maria Larrea. Mina studied Latin, mathematics, and humanities at the local seminary while living in Pamplona with his uncle and aunt, Clemente and Simona Espoz. At the age of 18, he left Otago to continue his education in Zaragoza, where he began studying law at the university.

During the Peninsular War in early 1808, Spain was under occupation by French troops, prompting Mina to flee to the hills and forests of his native region. There he formed a guerrilla force of ten men. Under his leadership, the force grew to over 200 men. Mina launched raids on the French and succeeded in capturing arms, ammunition, and horses. These additional resources allowed Mina to expand his small army to over 1,200 men and 150 mounted cavalries. He began to engage in full-scale military actions to find new strength in these numbers. Mina was captured in March 1810 and sent to Vincennes prison in France. He was finally released in April 1814, concurrent with the collapse of Napoleon's government.

On returning to Spain he was made a colonel of the Navarre Hussars by King Ferdinand VII. However, Mina didn not sympathize with the king, because he had abolished the democratic government created under the Constitution of 1812. After a planned coup d'état against the king failed, Mina fled to France; from Bayona he traveled to England where he met Servando Teresa de Mier.

Servando Teresa de Mier recruited him to fight the absolute monarchy of Ferdinand VII in his colonies. [The article about de Mier says that Mina was the one doing the convincing.] A few English lords made Mina's voyage to America possible. In May 1816, 20 Spanish officers and an Italian and English crew left Liverpool. 

After arriving in Baltimore in the United States, Mina met with a group of Spanish American agents there to organize the expedition. Manuel Torres, Miguel Santamaria and José Rafael Revenga helped organize funding from a group of Baltimore merchants, while Pedro Gual acted as his press agent. In September Mina sailed on two ships. First, Mina and his crew sailed from Baltimore to Puerto Principe, Haiti, and from Puerto Principe to Galveston, New Spain, where they arrived November 24. He then moved to what is now the nation of Mexico. In April 1817, Mina took a force of about 250 men southward in ships provided by the French privateer, Louis-Michel Aury. They arrived at Soto la Marina, Tamaulipas. He planned to join the southern Mexican revolutionaries led by Guadalupe Victoria and others.

Mina fully engaged in the struggle for Mexican independence. On May 24, 1817, Mina left his base with 300 men, moving to several villages on his way to Fuerte del Sombrero, a fortification defended by Pedro Moreno. Mina published a letter stating that he was fighting the King's tyranny, not the Spanish Empire. On August 1, Field Marshal Pascual Liñán arrived with a powerful army at the fort. Mina escaped to Fuerte de Los Remedios to help José Antonio Torres.

In October 1817, Mina was captured and Pedro Moreno was killed, at El Venadito ranch. The prisoner was presented to Colonel Francisco de Orrantia, who took him to Silao. Eventually, Mina was sent to the Liñán.

On November 11, 1817, Mina was executed by a firing squad on a hill close to the Fuerte de Los Remedios region of the Sierra de Pénjamo, by the Zaragoza Battalion. He was 28 years old.

Legacy
Martín Francisco Javier Mina y Larrea should not be confused with his successor and distant relative Francisco Espoz Ilundáin, generally known at the time as Francisco Espoz y Mina, a nom de guerre that he took to associate himself with the triumphs of his predecessor.

In the 1830s, a town in colonial Texas was renamed Mina; but a few years later (after the Texas Revolution), the name was changed back to Bastrop. Mina, a municipality of the northeastern Mexican state of Nuevo León, formerly named San Francisco de Cañas, was renamed on 31 March 1851 in honor of Francisco Javier Mina.

General Francisco Javier Mina International Airport or (IATA: TAM, ICAO: MMTM) is an international airport named after him, located at Tampico.

Bibliography 
 Mina El Mozo : Héroe De Navarra, Martín Luis Guzmán, Espasa Calpe. Madrid, 1932. Reedición en Txalaparta, Tafalla 2003
 Xavier Mina, guerrillero, liberal, insurgente, Manuel Ortuño Martínez, Universidad Pública de Navarra. Pamplona, 2000.
 Xavier Mina. Fronteras de libertad, Manuel Ortuño Martínez, Editorial Porrúa. México, 2003.
 Expedición a Nueva España de Xavier Mina, Manuel Ortuño Martínez, Universidad Pública de Navarra. Pamplona, 2006.
 Vida de Mina. Guerrillero, liberal, insurgente, Manuel Ortuño Martínez, Trama Editorial. Madrid, 2008.
 Charlas de café con Xavier Mina, Gloria López Morales, Ed. Grijalbo. 2010.
 Diarios: Expedición de Mina (1817), Brush, Webb, Bradburn y Terrés, Trama Editorial. Madrid, 2011
 Spanish Guerrillas in the Peninsular War 1808-1814, Renè Chartrand, Osprey Publishing. London, 2004
 Xavier Mina, el Insurgente Español. Guerrillero por la libertad de España y México, Gustavo Pérez Rodríguez, México, UNAM, 2018.

References

1789 births
1817 deaths
People from Navarre
 Spanish generals
 Spanish commanders of the Napoleonic Wars
 People of the Mexican War of Independence
 Executed Spanish people
 People executed for treason against Spain
 Executed Mexican people
 Deaths by firearm in Mexico
19th-century executions by Spain
 People executed by Spain by firing squad
Mexican revolutionaries
 People executed by New Spain
 Spanish guerrillas